Anđela may refer to:

 A Serbian version of a given name Angela

People 
 Anđela Bulatović - Montenegrin handball player 
 Anđela Frajtović - Serbian football player
 Anđela Janjušević - Serbian handball player
 Anđela Šešlija - Bosnian football player

References 

Serbian feminine given names